Charles William Frederick Field (11 December 1878 – 29 October 1949), known as Oakey Field, was an English professional footballer who played as an inside left or outside left for Sheffield United and Small Heath (later renamed Birmingham) in the Football League.

Playing career
Born in Hanwell, which is now in the London Borough of Ealing, Field played for Royal Ordnance Factories in the Southern League and for Brentford in the London League. He scored a hat-trick on his Brentford debut and helped the club gain promotion from Division Two in 1897 followed by runners-up spot in Division One the next season. He then signed for reigning Football League champions Sheffield United, for whom he played in the 1901 FA Cup Final, losing to Tottenham Hotspur, then of the Southern League, after a replay. In January 1902, together with teammate Billy Beer, Field joined Small Heath. Unable to prevent their relegation from the First Division that season, he contributed to their immediate promotion in 1902–03 as runners-up. He retired from football in 1906 following persistent injuries. He returned to Brentford in November 1907 to play for the reserves and retired at the end of the 1907–08 season, later setting up in business in the town.

Honours
Brentford
 London League Division Two runners-up: 1896–97
 London League Division One runners-up: 1897–98
 London Senior Cup: 1897–98
 Middlesex Senior Cup: 1897–98

Sheffield United
 FA Cup runners-up: 1900–01

Small Heath
 Football League Second Division runners-up: 1902–03

Notes

References

1878 births
1949 deaths
Footballers from Hanwell
English footballers
Association football wingers
Brentford F.C. players
Sheffield United F.C. players
Birmingham City F.C. players
Southern Football League players
English Football League players
Royal Ordnance Factories F.C. players
FA Cup Final players